Bamboo is the debut album by French composer Pierre Estève and was released in 1996 by Shooting Star. It is the first album in Esteve's MADe IN series, based on matters and materials from Chinese instrument classification, followed by Metal in 2001.

Track listing

Personnel
Musicians
Pierre Estève

Release history

References

1996 debut albums
Pierre Estève albums